Xunle Miao Ethnic Township is an ethnic township in Huanjiang Maonan Autonomous County, Guangxi, China.

Administrative division
As of 2021, the township is divided into two communities and ten villages:
Fushou Community
Pingzhi Community
Pingmo
Taiping
Quan'an
Shangang
Daji
Beishan
Zhenbei
Kangning
Changbei
Shunning

History
The area belonged to Anhua Department during the Qing dynasty (1644–1911).

In 1933 during the Republic of China, Xunle Township and Dao'an Township were founded and came under the jurisdiction of Yibei County.

In August 1951, it was under the jurisdiction of the 8th District. In February 1972, Shangchao Town was set up here. In 1984, it was renamed Xunle Miao Ethnic Township. In 2005, Shangchao Town was merged into the township.

Geography
The township lies at the northern of Huanjiang Maonan Autonomous County, bordering Chuanshan Town and Libo County to the west, Luoyang Town to the south, Congjiang County to the north, and Longyan Township and Minglun Town to the east.

The township enjoys a subtropical humid monsoon climate, enjoying four distinct seasons and abundant precipitation.

Economy
The township's economy is based on nearby mineral resources and agricultural resources. The region abounds with coal, lead, zinc, iron, arsenopyrite, vanadium, and manganese. The main crops are rice and corn. Castanea mollissima is one of the important economic crops in the region.

Demographics

The 2019 census reported the township had a population of 28563.

References

Bibliography

 

Divisions of Huanjiang Maonan Autonomous County